Katikithala Ramaswamy was a former judge of the Supreme Court of India.

Early life 
K. Ramaswamy was born into a poor family at Western Godavari district, Madras Presidency, British India.

He did B.A from West Godavari Bhimavaram College  and LLB from Andhra University College of Law.

Career
In 1962 he got enrolled as an advocate and practised in Civil & Criminal cases. He worked as additional public prosecutor and government pleader till 1972 to 1974.  He got appointed as Sr. Standing Counsel for Andhra Pradesh State Electricity Board and Addl. Judge of Andhra Pradesh High Court and served till 1982.

Later he became permanent Judge of the Andhra Pradesh High Court and vice-president, International Jurists Organisation (Asia).

Among the notable judgments authored by Justice Ramaswamy is the 1995 judgment in C Ravichandran Iyer v Justice AM  Bhattacharjee and served as the Executive Chairman of the National Legal Services Authority (NALSA). He is also popularly known for Samata Judgement that upheld the rights of tribals on their lands in tribal areas.

Justice Ramaswamy was also member of National Human Rights Commission.

Personal life
He died at his home in Hyderabad due to minor ailments. He had two daughters; his son K. Srinivas is an IAS officer of Gujarat cadre.

References

1932 births
2019 deaths
Justices of the Supreme Court of India
20th-century Indian judges
People from West Godavari district